The Men's 50 metre rifle prone event at the 2012 Olympic Games took place on 3 August 2012 at the Royal Artillery Barracks.

The event consisted of two rounds: a qualifier and a final. In the qualifier, each shooter fired 60 shots with a .22 Long Rifle at 50 metres distance from the prone position. Scores for each shot were in increments of 1, with a maximum score of 10.

The top 8 shooters in the qualifying round moved on to the final round. There, they fired an additional 10 shots. These shots were scored in increments of .1, with a maximum score of 10.9. The total score from all 70 shots were used to determine final ranking.

Records

Prior to this competition, the existing world and Olympic records were as follows.

Qualification round

Final

References

Shooting at the 2012 Summer Olympics
Men's 050m prone 2012
Men's events at the 2012 Summer Olympics